The cinnamon attila (Attila cinnamomeus) is a species of bird in the family Tyrannidae, the tyrant flycatchers.
It is found in northern South America in the Amazon Basin of Brazil and the Guianas.
It is found in Brazil, Colombia, Venezuela, Guyana, Suriname, and French Guiana; also Amazonian Ecuador, Peru, and regions of Bolivia.
Its natural habitat is subtropical or tropical swamps.

Distribution
The cinnamon attila is found in one contiguous range centered on the Amazon Basin. In the southwest it is at the Basin's headwaters in Ecuador and Peru; in northwest Bolivia it is centered on headwater tributaries of the Amazon's Madeira River; in Bolivia's northeast it is only on the headwaters of the Guapore, (on the Brazil-Bolivia border), but not on downstream sections, that flow into the Madeira.

Northwest of the Amazon Basin the continuous range extends into central and northeastern Colombia. In southeastern Venezuela, the cinnamon attila range occurs on the upper Orinoco River drainage; it continues into eastern and northeastern Venezuela and the Guianas, avoiding only the central Orinoco. Its range stays contiguous along the Caribbean coast through the Guianas and only ends south and southeast of the Amazon River outlet with Marajo Island, and the outlet of the downstream Tocantins River, in the northeastern Brazilian state of Maranhão on the Atlantic coast.

References

External links
Cinnamon attila videos on the Internet Bird Collection
Cinnamon attila photo gallery VIREO Photo-High Res
Photo-High Res; Article oiseaux
Photo-Medium Res; Article & analysis www.nsf.gov

cinnamon attila
Birds of the Amazon Basin
Birds of the Guianas
cinnamon attila
cinnamon attila
Birds of Brazil
Taxonomy articles created by Polbot